Faizel Samsoodien (born 17 November 1958) is a South African cricket umpire. He stood as one of the umpires in the 2010 ICC Women's Cricket Challenge, a limited overs tournament, in October 2010.

In South Africa domestic cricket, he has stood in matches in the 2016–17 Sunfoil 3-Day Cup and the 2016–17 CSA Provincial One-Day Challenge tournaments.

References

External links
 

1958 births
Living people
South African cricket umpires
Sportspeople from Johannesburg